Zagoni is a village in the municipality of Bratunac, Republika Srpska, Bosnia and Herzegovina.

Bosnian War
In Zagoni 1991 lived 588  inhabitants, of which 483 (82,14%) Serbs. In 1992 the village was twice time attacked by Bosnian Muslim army. The first time on 5 July 1992 and the second time 12 July 1992. In the first attack Bosnian Muslims killed 14 and the second 7 Serbs.

References

Villages in Republika Srpska
Populated places in Bratunac